Kent is the debut studio album by the Swedish rock band Kent, released in 1995.

Track listing

Personnel
Joakim Berg – lyrics, music
Martin Sköld – music
Nille Perned – producer, mixing, mastering
Zmago Smon – mixing
Peter Dahl - mastering

Charts

References 

1995 debut albums
Kent (band) albums
Swedish-language albums